Arabius Scholasticus was a writer of classical antiquity who was the author of seven epigrams in the Greek Anthology, most of which are upon works of art. He lived probably in the reign of Justinian.

References

Ancient Greek writers
Epigrammatists of the Greek Anthology